Hame Sele (born 12 November 1996) is an Australian professional rugby league footballer who plays as a  and  forward for the South Sydney Rabbitohs in the NRL.

He previously played for the St. George Illawarra Dragons and the Penrith Panthers in the National Rugby League, and played at representative level for NSW City in 2017.

Background
Sele was born in Kogarah, New South Wales, Australia. He is of Tongan descent.

He played his junior rugby league for the Kingsgrove Colts, before being signed by the St. George Illawarra Dragons.

Playing career

Early career
From 2014 to 2016, Sele played for the St. George Illawarra Dragons' NYC team. Late in 2014, he played for the Australian Schoolboys. In July 2015, he played for the New South Wales under-20s team against the Queensland under-20s team. In May 2016, he re-signed with the Dragons on a 2-year contract until the end of 2018.

2017
In 2017, Sele graduated to the Dragons' Intrust Super Premiership NSW team, Illawarra Cutters. In round 6 of the 2017 NRL season, he made his NRL debut for the Dragons against the Manly Warringah Sea Eagles. In May, he was selected in the New South Wales City team, named at lock, he would play in the final ever City vs Country Origin clash on 7 May.

2018
Sele only managed to play 3 NRL games for the season, all of them coming from the interchange bench. At the end of the 2018 season, he was released from the Dragons.

2019
Sele signed with the Penrith Panthers for the start of the 2019 NRL season. He made his debut for Penrith in Round 1 against Parramatta which ended in a 20-12 defeat at Panthers Stadium.

On 16 September, it was announced that Sele was one of ten players that were to be released by the Penrith club at the end of the season.

2020
Early in 2020 Sele joined South Sydney Rabbitohs on a 'train and trial' deal.

He made 7 appearances for South Sydney in the 2020 NRL season as the club reached their third straight preliminary final before losing to Penrith.

2021
Sele scored his first try for South Sydney in round 15 of the 2021 NRL season against Brisbane.  Souths would go on to win the game 46-0.

2022
Sele played a total of 14 games for South Sydney in the 2022 NRL season including all three of the clubs finals matches as they reached the preliminary final for a fifth straight season.  Souths would lose in the preliminary final to eventual premiers Penrith 32-12.

References

External links

South Sydney Rabbitohs profile
Penrith Panthers profile
St. George Illawarra Dragons profile

1996 births
Living people
Australian rugby league players
Australian sportspeople of Tongan descent
New South Wales City Origin rugby league team players
Illawarra Cutters players
Penrith Panthers players
Rugby league locks
Rugby league players from New South Wales
Rugby league props
Rugby league second-rows
South Sydney Rabbitohs players
St. George Illawarra Dragons players